Two ships in the United States Navy have been named USS Crusader.

  was a steamship during the American Civil War.
  was originally Osprey and was renamed in 1941.

United States Navy ship names